Katrine Tjølsen (born 1993) is a Norwegian chess player.
 
She achieved the title Woman FIDE Master in 2008, and was awarded the Woman International Master title in 2010. She represented Norway in the Women's Chess Olympiad in 2008 and 2010.

Tjølsen has been named as the model for investigator "Patricia Louise Borchmann" in a series of crime novels by Hans Olav Lahlum.

References

External links

Norwegian female chess players
1993 births
Living people
Chess Woman International Masters